Papa Hemingway may refer to:

People
 Ernest Hemingway,  American novelist, short story writer, and journalist

Books
 A. E. Hotchner's Papa Hemingway (1966), a biographical portrait of the writer Ernest Hemingway

Film
 Papa: Hemingway in Cuba (2015)